The Kumasi Technical University, formerly known as Kumasi Polytechnic, is a public tertiary institution in the Ashanti Region of Ghana.

Kumasi Technical University is one of the Polytechnics in Ghana diverted into University. It is located at the heart of Kumasi, the capital city of the Ashanti Region of Ghana. The Vice of the Kumasi Technical University is Professor Nana Osei-Wusu Achiaw. He is the first VC since it was diverted into a University

History 
The university, known earlier as Kumasi Technical Institute, was established in 1954, but started actual teaching and learning in 1955, dealing mainly with craft courses. It became a polytechnic on 30 October 1963 and a university in 2017. From then on, it concentrated on Technician and a few Diploma Programmes. Additionally, a few professional courses were offered. Following the enactment of the Polytechnic Law 1992, PNDC Law 321, Kumasi Polytechnic ceased to exist in its previous form and became a tertiary institution.

Faculties 
It has expanded from three faculties and one centre in 2009/2010 to six faculties, one school and two institutes in the 2010/2011 academic year. The polytechnic is currently organised into the following faculties, Schools and Institutes:

 Faculty of Engineering
 Faculty of Built and Natural Environment
 Faculty of Medicine and Health Sciences
 Faculty of Applied Sciences
 Faculty of Creative Arts and Technology
 School of Business 
 Institute of Entrepreneurship and Enterprise Development
 Institute of Distance and Continuing Education
 School of Graduate Studies, Research and Innovation

Departments 
Source:

School of Business 

Accountancy and Accounting Information Systems Department
Liberal Studies Department
Management Studies Department
Marketing Department
Procurement and Supply Chain Management Department

Faculty of Built and Natural Environment 

Building Technology Department
Estate Management Department
Interior Architecture and Furniture Production Department

Faculty of Engineering 

Chemical Engineering Department
Civil Engineering Department
Electrical/Electronic Engineering Department
Mechanical Engineering Department

Faculty of Applied Sciences 
Computer Science Department
Hotel, Catering and Institutional Management Department
Mathematics and Statistics Department

Faculty of Creative Arts and Technology 
Fashion Design and Textiles Department
Graphic Design Department

Faculty of Medicine and Health Sciences 
Laboratory Technology Department
Pharmaceutical Sciences Department

Institute of Entrepreneurship and Enterprise Development 
Agropreneurship
Centre for Entrepreneurship Research in Africa
Consultancy and Business Incubation Centre
Entrepreneurship and Finance

Programmes offered

Faculty of Business and Management Studies 
Bachelor of Technology in Accounting with Computing
Bachelor of Technology in Procurement Management
BSC. FINANCIAL ACCOUNTING (SPECIAL PROGRAMME)
BSC. MARKETING (SPECIAL PROGRAMME)
BSC. PROCUREMENT (SPECIAL PROGRAMME)
Certificate in Accounting
Diploma in Banking Technology and Accounting (DBTA)
Diploma in Business Administration (DBA)
Diploma in Business Studies (Accountancy, Entrepreneurship, Secretarial, Statistics, Management, Marketing and Purchasing and Supply options)
Diploma in Computerised Accounting (DCA)
Diploma in Electronic Marketing
Diploma in Procurement & Materials Management
Diploma in Public Relations
HND Accountancy (Regular/Evening/Weekend Options)
HND Accounting with Computing (Regular/Evening/Weekend Options)
HND Marketing (Regular/Evening/Weekend Options)
HND Purchasing and Supply (Regular/Evening/Weekend Options)
HND Secretaryship and Management Studies (Regular/ Evening/Weekend Options)
Post Graduate Certificate in Computerized Accounting (PGCCA)
Professional Diploma in Banking Technology and Accounting (PDBTA)
Professional Diploma in Computerised Accounting (PDCA)

Faculty of Built and Natural Environment 
Interior Architecture & Furniture Production (Access Course)
Advanced Furniture Craft
Bachelor of Technology in Building Technology
Bachelor of Technology in Estate Management
BSC. ESTATE MANAGEMENT (SPECIAL PROGRAMME)
Building Technology (Access Course)
Construction Technicians Course I
Construction Technicians Course II
Construction Technicians Course Part III.
HND Building Technology (Regular Only)
HND Estate Management (Regular Only)
HND Interior Architecture and Furniture Production (Regular Only)
Interior Architecture and Furniture Production (Access Course)

Faculty of Engineering 
Bachelor of Technology in Chemical Engineering
Bachelor of Technology in Chemical Engineering - Top Up
Bachelor of Technology in  Civil Engineering 

Bachelor of Technology in Civil Engineering - Top Up
Bachelor of Technology in Mechanical Engineering
Bachelor of Technology in Mechanical Engineering - Top Up
BSC. OIL AND GAS ENGINEERING (SPECIAL PROGRAMME)
BSC. PETRO-CHEMICAL ENGINEERING (SPECIAL PROGRAMME)
Chemical Engineering (Access Course)
Civil Engineering (Access Course)
Electrical Engineering Technician Part I
Electrical Engineering Technician Part II
Electrical Engineering Technicians Part III
Electrical/Electronic Engineering(Access Course)
HND Chemical Engineering (Regular Only)
HND Civil Engineering (Regular Only)
HND Electrical/Electronic Engineering (Regular Only)
HND Mechanical Engineering with choice of options at Level 200 Options: (I) Plant (II) Production (III) Automotive and (IV) Metallurgy (Regular Only)
Mechanical Engineering (Access Course)
Mechanical Engineering Technicians Part I
Mechanical Engineering Technicians Part II
Mechanical Engineering Technicians Part III
Motor Vehicle Technicians Part I
Motor Vehicle Technicians Part II
Motor Vehicle Technicians Part III

Faculty of Applied Sciences 
BSC. COMPUTER SCIENCE (SPECIAL PROGRAMME)
Catering 812/1
Catering 812/2
Diploma in Hardware and Networking
Diploma in Information Technology
Diploma in Web Applications and Database
HND Computer Science (Regular Only)
HND Hotel, Catering and Institutional Management (Regular Only)
HND Statistics (Regular Only)
Hotel, Catering and Institutional Management (Access Course)

Faculty of Creative Arts and Technology 
Access Course
Advanced Fashion Design
HND Fashion Design and Textiles Studies (Regular Only)
Intermediate Fashion

Faculty of Medicine and Health Sciences 
BSC. PHARMACEUTICAL SCIENCE (SPECIAL PROGRAMME)
HND Dispensing Technology (Regular Only)
HND Medical Laboratory
HND Science Laboratory
ONE YEAR TOP-UP HND DISPENSING TECHNOLOGY PROGRAMME

Facilities
It has also established an ICT Directorate headed by a Director and an office for International Affairs and Institutional Linkages also headed by a Director.

The School comprises 27 Departments offering Full – time and Part – time programmes at Tertiary and Non – Tertiary Levels. The Polytechnic offers unique programmes such as Estate Management and Dispensing Technology and these disciplines attract students from Uganda, Sierra Leone, Nigeria, the West African sub regions.

The institution is presently running degree programmes in addition to its Higher National Diploma (HND) programmes.

Vision and mission

Vision
To be a Centre of Excellence for tertiary level training of technical and professional human resource with entrepreneurial skills.

Mission
To provide a favourable environment for teaching, research, skills and entrepreneurship training in science, technology, applied social sciences and applied arts for industrial and community development. This is to attract students and scholars from local and international communities and also to provide consultancy services.

References

Polytechnics in Ghana
Education in Kumasi
Educational institutions established in 1954
1954 establishments in Gold Coast (British colony)